Jane Louise Parry (born 1964) is a female former track and field athlete who competed for England in the 400 metres.

Athletics career
Parry represented England in the 4 x 400 metres relay event with Kathy Smallwood-Cook, Linda Keough and Angela Piggford, at the 1986 Commonwealth Games in Edinburgh, Scotland.

References

1964 births
Living people
Athletes (track and field) at the 1986 Commonwealth Games
Commonwealth Games medallists in athletics
Commonwealth Games silver medallists for England
English female sprinters
Medallists at the 1986 Commonwealth Games